Schally is a surname. Notable people with the surname include:

Andrew Schally (born 1926), American endocrinologist
Kazimierz Schally (1895–1967), Polish general